2-Oxoquazepam (Sch 15725) is a benzodiazepine derivative and one of the major active metabolites of quazepam (Doral).

References 

Benzodiazepines
Chloroarenes
GABAA receptor positive allosteric modulators
Lactams
Fluoroarenes
Trifluoromethyl compounds